Crépy, formerly known as Crépy-en-Laonnais, is a commune in the Aisne department in Hauts-de-France in northern France.

History
The treaty of Crépy, during the Italian War of 1542–1546 was signed there between Francis I of France and Holy Roman Emperor Charles V on 18 September 1544.

Population

Geography

Climate
This area is characterized by equable climates with few extremes of temperature and ample precipitation in all months. It is located poleward of the Mediterranean climate region on the western sides of the continents, between 35° and 60° N and S latitude.  The Köppen Climate Classification subtype for this climate is "Cfb". (Marine West Coast Climate).

See also
 Communes of the Aisne department

Notes

References

Communes of Aisne
Aisne communes articles needing translation from French Wikipedia